Tête, head in French, may refer to :

 Tête (sculpture), a 1912 work of art by Amedeo Modigliani; one of the most expensive sculptures ever sold
 "Je danse dans ma tête", a 1991 song from the Dion chante Plamondon album by Céline Dion
 Tête-bêche, a joined pair of stamps in philately
 Tête Jaune (died 1828), Iroquois-Métis trapper/furtrader/explorer
 Tête Jaune Cache, British Columbia, a town in Canada 
 Tête à Tête (Murray Head album), a 2007 studio album by Murray Head
 Tête de Moine, a Swiss cheese
 Grosse Tête, Louisiana, a village in the United States of America 
 La mauvaise tête, a 1957 Spirou et Fantasio album
 Tête-à-la-Baleine Airport, in Tête-à-La-Baleine, Quebec
 a title in the list of Picasso artworks 1911-1920
 Tête Blanche, a mountain in the Alps

See also
 Roman Catholic Diocese of Tete
 Tete Montoliu (1933–1997)
 Tété
 Teté (1907–1962)
 Tete Province
 Chingale de Tete 
 Desportivo Tete
 Stadio de Tete 
 Physokentia tete
 Sumrai Tete (born 1979)